Brayan Josué Velásquez Moya (born 19 October 1993) is a Honduran professional footballer who plays as an attacking midfielder or forward for Olimpia and the Honduras national team.

Club career
Moya made his professional debut for C.D.S. Vida on 23 August 2015 in the Liga Nacional de Fútbol Profesional de Honduras. He replaced Marcelo Canales in a 1–0 defeat against C.D. Victoria. He scored his first goal the following 19 September in a 2–1 win against C.D. Honduras Progreso.

On 22 December 2016, C.D. Olimpia confirmed the signing of Moya. He made his debut – as a starter – for the club the following 8 January in the 5–2 home win against Honduras Progreso in the Clausura tournament. He scored his first goal for Los Albos on 7 October 2017, the winner in a 2–1 away win against Platense F.C.

On 7 January 2019, Moya signed with Venezuelan Primera División side Zulia F.C. The following 17 February, Moya made his debut coming off the bench and scoring a brace in the 2–1 win over Academia Puerto Cabello.

On 15 July 2020, Moya joined Angolan Girabola side C.D. Primeiro de Agosto. He made his debut on 28 October in the 3–1 win against FC Valientes de Maquis. He scored his first goal three days later in a 3–2 win over G.D. Sagrada Esperança. On 9 November 2021, Primeiro de Agosto terminated Moya's contract, due to a legal problem surrounding his previous club, Zulia, claiming that he still had a contract with them.

On 14 January 2022, Moya returned to Olimpia. He scored his first goal in his second spell at the club, in a 3–0 home win against Honduras Progreso in the league.

International career
Moya received his first ever national team call-up on 28 August 2019 for friendlies against Puerto Rico and Chile. He made his international debut for Honduras on 5 September 2019 in the 4–0 win against Puerto Rico and scored his first international goal against Trinidad and Tobago the following 10 October in 2–0 victory during the CONCACAF Nations League.

In July 2021, Moya was called up as one of the three overage players to be included in Honduras' squad for the 2020 Summer Olympics in Tokyo, Japan.

International goals
Scores and results list Honduras' goal tally first.

Honours
Olimpia
 Liga Nacional: 2016 Clausura, 2022 Apertura
 CONCACAF League: 2017, 2022

References

1993 births
Living people
Honduran footballers
Association football midfielders
Liga Nacional de Fútbol Profesional de Honduras players
Venezuelan Primera División players
Girabola players
C.D.S. Vida players
C.D. Olimpia players
Zulia F.C. players
C.D. Primeiro de Agosto players
Honduras international footballers
Honduran expatriate footballers
Expatriate footballers in Venezuela
Expatriate footballers in Angola
People from Francisco Morazán Department
Footballers at the 2020 Summer Olympics
Olympic footballers of Honduras